is a video game developed by Beam Software and released in 1991 exclusively for the Game Boy. It is a follow-up to the original Choplifter and the first entry in the series released for the Game Boy.

Gameplay

Gameplay is largely the same as the original Choplifter and revolves around piloting a rescue helicopter into hostile territory and rescuing hostages. Enemies like birds, fighter jets, and ammunition fired from various weapons can harm the player's helicopter. Saving more hostages than the scenario requires will allow players to collect extra points. However, losing a lot of hostages will lead to a loss of continues; regardless of how many lives the player has during that time.

Reception
Mean Machines gave the game a 90%, calling it a "perfect mini blastathon which packs thrills and spills in a totally addictive package that's impossible to resist" and "a simple, yet highly compelling game..." that "should keep you glued to your Gameboy for weeks". Gary Whitta, writing for Advanced Computer Entertainment, gave the game a positive review, commenting on the portable sequel's faithfulness to its predecessor.

French Magazine  gave the game an 82%, calling it a "pleasant and fun game which still has a flaw; the controls".

References

External links

1991 video games
Game Boy games
Game Boy-only games
Helicopter video games
Video game sequels
Horizontally scrolling shooters
Multiplayer and single-player video games
Video games developed in Australia